Sims is a village in Wayne County, Illinois, United States. The population was 166 at the 2020 census.

Geography

Demographics

As of the census of 2000, there were 273 people, 100 households, and 70 families residing in the village. The racial makeup of the village was 100% White, 0% African American and 0% Asian.

There were 102 households, out of which 34.3% had children under the age of 18 living with them, 50.0% were married couples living together, 10.6% had a female householder with no husband present, and 20.5% were non-families. 15.6% of all households were made up of individuals, and 6.9% had someone living alone who was 65 years of age or older. The average household size was 2.68 and the average family size was 3.00.

In the village, the population was spread out, with 27.8% under the age of 18, 7.7% from 18 to 24, 52.1% from 25 to 44, 29.9% from 45 to 64, and 18.5% who were 65 years of age or older. The median age was 32 years. For every 100 females, there were 95.0 males. For every 100 females age 18 and over, there were 93.1 males.

The median income for a household in the village was $29,983, and the median income for a family was $25,625. Males had a median income of $25,666 versus $15,542 for females. The per capita income for the village was $30,870.

References

Villages in Wayne County, Illinois
Villages in Illinois